Merzario was a Formula One and Formula Two team and constructor from Italy. The team participated in 38 Formula One World Championship Grands Prix but scored no championship points.

Formula One

1977
Merzario was set up in 1977 by former Ferrari, Williams and March driver Arturo Merzario when he could no longer find a drive with an established team. He initially campaigned a March 761B during , his best result being 14th in the 1977 Belgian Grand Prix. This proved to be the only occasion in three years of participation in Formula One that one of their cars was classified at the finish of a World Championship Grand Prix. During the early part of the season Merzario's car was consistently the fastest of a number of March 761s on the grid, though as the season wore on, he slipped down the grids and finally decided to abandon the season and concentrate on the following year and his new car.

1978
In 1978 Merzario partnered with Swiss Formula One entrant Guglielmo Bellasi and laid the foundation for his own team. Merzario's first self-built Formula One effort, the A1, appeared in 1978 and was a basically conventional car based largely on his March 761B, with a red colour scheme and crude bodywork vaguely reminiscent of a Ferrari 312T2 in its use of cockpit-side ducting for an air intake. It used the then-common combination of the Cosworth DFV engine and Hewland gearbox. The livery changed from red to black before the 1978 Monaco Grand Prix, though it was not until the Swedish Grand Prix that it finished a race, although unclassified, being eight laps adrift of the winner after a long pitstop. For the Austrian Grand Prix, a second A1 was unveiled, although it was suspected that this was actually the team's old March 761B with new bodywork. With this car at his disposal, Merzario performed slightly better in qualifying but still failed to be classified in a race. For the Italian Grand Prix, both A1s were entered, with Alberto Colombo driving the original A1 and Merzario taking the newer second A1. Colombo posted the slowest time during qualifying and did not make the grid, while Merzario qualified comfortably, only for the engine to fail during the race. The team qualified the car on eight occasions during 1978, but retired seven times with mechanical failures.

1979
For the 1979 Formula One season the second A1 was revised into the A1B with more elegant bodywork and revised front suspension, and a new yellow and black livery. The A1B was the only Merzario to qualify for Grands Prix during 1979, which it did twice, though it retired on both occasions.

The A2 (designated A3 by some sources), designed by Merzario and Simon Hadfield and based on the first A1, was ready in time for the European rounds of the 1979 season with the same engine and gearbox combination, and it had been modified into a ground effect 'wing' car. Only one example was built. The A2 first took to the racetrack at the 1979 United States Grand Prix West in the hands of Arturo Merzario. Merzario qualified the car for the race but after the front suspension failed he had to start the race in the A1B. The car officially made its debut at the 1979 Spanish Grand Prix, where Merzario set the 26th time during qualifying and failed to make the race. At the next race in Belgium, Merzario crashed during qualifying and broke his arm. For Monaco Merzario asked Gianfranco Brancatelli to drive his car, but Brancatelli failed to pre-qualify. Merzario was back at the wheel at the  French Grand Prix. He set the 26th time during qualifying and was more than two seconds slower than the last qualifier. The A2 took to the track for the last time at the Austrian Grand Prix, after Merzario damaged the A4 in a practice accident.

By this time, Merzario and Bellasi had purchased the assets of the Kauhsen team (and their driver Brancatelli), arguably taking on cars even worse than his old March-based vehicle. The Kauhsen chassis was rebuilt by Gian Paolo Dallara and renamed the Merzario A4. The A4 employed the same Cosworth / Hewland running gear and the suspension was similar to the A2, but the bodywork was less bulky, with better sidepods for improved airflow. However, the car again failed to qualify for every Grand Prix that it entered, proving even slower than its predecessors. The only time the A4 was not the slowest car in qualifying was at the Italian Grand Prix, where Héctor Rebaque was seven tenths slower in his Rebaque HR100. However, Merzario did qualify and race the car in the non-championship Dino Ferrari Grand Prix at Imola, where he finished 11th and last, two laps down.

After Formula One
After plans to modify the A4 into the A5 were not completed due to financial problems, Merzario turned to constructing Formula Two cars. He was keen to point out that the engine bay of his 1980 BMW-engined M1 F2 machine could easily be modified to take a Cosworth DFV F1 engine, though no such effort was ever made. The car was fairly unsuccessful in F2, and Merzario decided to return to running March chassis for 1981. With March 812s, the team finally scored two podiums in F2, with Piero Necchi at the wheel, but after a lacklustre 1982 season, Merzario again built his own cars for 1983 with minimal success. After moving down to Italian Formula 3, he finally moved away from team ownership in the mid-1980s.

Racing record

Complete Formula One results
(key)

Complete Formula Two results
(key)

References

External links
 Team Merzario website

Formula One constructors
Formula One entrants
Formula Two entrants
Italian auto racing teams
Italian racecar constructors
Italian Formula 3 teams